Bignona is a town with commune status located in the Ziguinchor Region of Senegal (Casamance). It briefly appears in the movie Binta and the Great Idea.

Its population on 2013 was 27,826.

Notable people
Landing Savané, politician
Ibrahima Sonko, footballer
Moussa Wague, footballer
Lamine Diarra, footballer
Séni Camara, sculptor
Mamadou Lamine Keïta, politician
Augustin Sagna, Roman Catholic prelate
Abdou Sané, politician
Émile Badiane, politician
Amadou Sylla, President and founder of SOS CASAMANCE
Amadou Diallo Washington, Economist, Politician

National roads
The N4, running north to Kaolack via Bounkiling and Gambia (Trans-Gambia Highway) and south to Ziguinchor.
The N5, running north to Kaolack via Banjul, (capital of Gambia).

References

Communes of Senegal
Populated places in the Bignona Department